627 Charis  is an asteroid and the parent body of the Charis family, located in the outer regions of the asteroid belt, approximately 49 kilometers in diameter. It was discovered on 4 March 1907, by German astronomer August Kopff at the Heidelberg-Königstuhl State Observatory in southwest Germany. The asteroid was named after the Greek goddess Charis, a name which may have been inspired by the asteroid's provisional designation 1907 XS. ('Charis' is in Greek is spelled 'Χάρις'.)

Orbit and classification 

Charis is the parent body of the Charis family, an asteroid family of more than 800 known members. It orbits the Sun in the outer main-belt at a distance of 2.7–3.1 AU once every 4 years and 11 months (1,804 days; semi-major axis of 2.90 AU). Its orbit has an eccentricity of 0.06 and an inclination of 6° with respect to the ecliptic. The body's observation arc begins with its official discovery observation at Heidelberg in March 1907.

Physical characteristics 

The overall spectral type for members of the Charis family is that of a C- and X-type. In the SMASS classification Charis is an X-type asteroid, while in the Tholen classification, its type is ambiguous, closest to an X- and somewhat similar to a carbonaceous B-type asteroid including a reported noisy spectrum (XB:). Conversely, the Wide-field Infrared Survey Explorer (WISE) characterized it as a primitive P-type asteroid.

Rotation period 

Photometric observations of this asteroid by American astronomer Frederick Pilcher at the Organ Mesa Observatory in Las Cruces, New Mexico, during May 2012 gave a well-defined lightcurve with a rotation period of 27.888 hours and a brightness variation of 0.35 in magnitude. The result supersedes a tentative period of at least 24 hours obtained by French amateur astronomer Pierre Antonini in March 2011.

Diameter and albedo 

According to the surveys carried out by the Infrared Astronomical Satellite IRAS, the Japanese Akari satellite and the NEOWISE mission of NASA's WISE telescope, Charis measures between 38.018 and 62.68 kilometers in diameter and its surface has an albedo between 0.047 and 0.0925.

The Collaborative Asteroid Lightcurve Link adopts the results obtained by IRAS, that is, an albedo of 0.0786 and a diameter of 48.51 kilometers based on an absolute magnitude of 9.95.

Naming 

This minor planet was named from Greek mythology, after the goddess Charis, the wife of Hephaestus after whom the minor planet  was also named. The official naming citation was mentioned in The Names of the Minor Planets by Paul Herget in 1955.

References

External links 
 Asteroid Lightcurve Database (LCDB), query form (info )
 Dictionary of Minor Planet Names, Google books
 Asteroids and comets rotation curves, CdR – Observatoire de Genève, Raoul Behrend
 Discovery Circumstances: Numbered Minor Planets (1)-(5000) – Minor Planet Center
 
 

000627
Discoveries by August Kopff
Named minor planets
000627
000627
19070304